The Bride Show is the leading annual wedding event in the Middle East, comprising The Bride Show Abu Dhabi and The Bride Show Dubai. More than 300 exhibitors participates in the show annually. The main exhibitors are fashion designer, hairstylists, cosmetologists and wedding planners. Apart from these some other exhibitors are show photographers, florists, wedding coordinators, professionals of wedding dresses & gowns and professionals of Fashion accessories, Bakeries, Banking, Beauty & Skin Care and Bridal Fashion. It is organised by Informa Exhibitions.

The Bride Show Abu Dhabi 
The Bride Show Abu Dhabi is a consumer event primarily for affluent Emirati women who are brides-to-be and their families, as well as Middle Eastern women; and fashionistas who enjoy fashion, beauty and style. The Bride Show Abu Dhabi attracted 14,949 consumers in 2011. It is highly established as the largest gathering of women, in the region, who are either planning their wedding or are interested in fashion, beauty and style. It is held at Abu Dhabi National Exhibition Centre.

The Bride Show Dubai 
The Bride Show Dubai showcases bridal couture from international brands at its fashion show including events like marriage guidance, cooking shows and parlor treatments to go with the wedding theme. Over 20,000 visitors participate in the Bride Show Dubai. The show includes exhibition of Bridal Accessories, Jewellery, Bridal gowns, groom's wear, Hair Services & Products and shoes, wedding stationery, bags and magazines. It is held at the Dubai International Convention Centre.

References

External links 
 The Bride Show Official Website 
 Informa Exhibition Official Website

Events in Dubai
Events in Abu Dhabi
Trade fairs in the United Arab Emirates